Czechoslovakia competed at the 1968 Summer Olympics in Mexico City, Mexico. 121 competitors, 94 men and 27 women, took part in 66 events in 14 sports.

Medalists

Athletics

Boxing

Canoeing

Cycling

Eight cyclists represented Czechoslovakia in 1968.

Individual road race
 Jan Smolík
 Petr Hladík

Sprint
 Ivan Kučírek
 Miloš Jelínek

1000m time trial
 Miloš Jelínek

Tandem
 Ivan Kučírek
 Miloš Jelínek

Individual pursuit
 Jiří Daler

Individual pursuit
 Jiří Daler
 Pavel Kondr
 Milan Puzrla
 František Řezáč

Diving

Football

Gymnastics

Modern pentathlon

One male pentathlete represented Czechoslovakia in 1968.

Individual
 Pavel Kupka

Rowing

In 1968, Czechoslovakia entered boats in four of the seven events: men's single sculls, men's double sculls, men's coxed pair, men's eight. The competition was for men only; women would first row at the 1976 Summer Olympics.

Shooting

Eight shooters, all men, represented Czechoslovakia in 1968. Jan Kůrka won gold in the 50 m rifle, prone.

25 m pistol
 Lubomír Nácovský
 Ladislav Falta

50 m pistol
 Hynek Hromada
 Jaroslav Veselý

300 m rifle, three positions
 Jan Kůrka
 Ondrej Šima

50 m rifle, three positions
 Jan Kůrka
 Jaroslav Navrátil

50 m rifle, prone
 Jan Kůrka
 Rudolf Pojer

Swimming

Volleyball

Men's Team Competition
Round robin
 Defeated East Germany (3-2) 
 Defeated United States (3-1) 
 Defeated Japan (3-2) 
 Defeated Brazil (3-2) 
 Defeated Mexico (3-0) 
 Defeated Bulgaria (3-2) 
 Defeated Belgium (3-0) 
 Lost to Poland (1-3) 
 Lost to Soviet Union (0-3) → Bronze Medal
Team Roster
Antonín Procházka
Jiří Svoboda
Luboš Zajíček
Josef Musil
Josef Smolka
Vladimír Petlák
Petr Kop
František Sokol
Bohunil Golián
Zdeněk Groessl
Pavel Schenk
Drahomír Koudelka 
Head coach: Václav Matiášek

Women's Team Competition
Round robin
 Lost to Soviet Union (1-3)
 Defeated United States (3-1)
 Defeated Mexico (3-0)
 Lost to Japan (0-3)
 Defeated Peru (3-2)
 Lost to Poland (0-3) 
 Lost to South Korea (1-3) → Sixth place
Team Roster

Weightlifting

Wrestling

References

External links
Official Olympic Reports
International Olympic Committee results database
Czech olympic report (in Czech)

Nations at the 1968 Summer Olympics
1968
Summer Olympics